Auto racing (also known as car racing, motor racing, or automobile racing) is a motorsport involving the racing of automobiles for competition.

Auto racing has existed since the invention of the automobile. Races of various sorts were organised, with the first recorded as early as 1867. Many of the earliest events were effectively reliability trials, aimed at proving these new machines were a practical mode of transport, but soon became an important way for automobile makers to demonstrate their machines. By the 1930s, specialist racing cars had developed.

There are now numerous different categories, each with different rules and regulations.

History

It was won by the carriage of Isaac Watt Boulton.

Internal combustion auto racing events began soon after the construction of the first successful gasoline-fueled automobiles. The first organized contest was on April 28, 1887, by the chief editor of Paris publication , Monsieur Fossier. It ran  from Neuilly Bridge to the Bois de Boulogne.

On July 22, 1894, the Parisian magazine  organized what is considered to be the world's first motoring competition, from Paris to Rouen. One hundred and two competitors paid a 10-franc entrance fee.

The first American automobile race is generally held to be the Thanksgiving Day Chicago Times-Herald race of November 28, 1895. Press coverage of the event first aroused significant American interest in the automobile.

The Targa Florio was an open road endurance automobile race held in the mountains of Sicily, Italy near the island's capital of Palermo. Founded in 1906, it was the oldest sports car racing event, part of the World Sportscar Championship between 1955 and 1973.

With auto construction and racing dominated by France, the French automobile club ACF staged a number of major international races, usually from or to Paris, connecting with another major city, in France or elsewhere in Europe.

Aspendale Racecourse, in Australia, was the world's first purpose-built motor racing circuit, opening in January 1906. The pear-shaped track was close to a mile in length, with slightly banked curves and a gravel surface of crushed cement.

Brooklands, in Surrey, England, was the first purpose-built 'banked' motor racing venue, opening in June 1907. It featured a  concrete track with high-speed banked corners.

One of the oldest existing purpose-built automobile racing circuits in the United States, still in use, is the  Indianapolis Motor Speedway in Speedway, Indiana. It is the largest capacity sports venue of any variety worldwide, with a top capacity of some 257,000+ seated spectators.

NASCAR was founded by Bill France Sr. on February 21, 1948, with the help of several other drivers of the time. The first NASCAR "Strictly Stock" race ever was held on June 19, 1949, at Daytona Beach, Florida, U.S..

From 1962 through 2003, NASCAR's premier series was called the Winston Cup Series, sponsored by R. J. Reynolds Tobacco Company cigarette brand Winston. The changes that resulted from RJR's involvement, as well as the reduction of the schedule from 56 to 34 races a year, established 1972 as the beginning of NASCAR's "modern era".

The IMSA GT Series evolved into the American Le Mans Series, which ran its first season in 1998. The European races eventually became the closely related European Le Mans Series, both of which mix prototypes and GTs.

 (TC) is a popular touring car racing series in Argentina, and one of the oldest car racing series still active in the world. The first TC competition took place in 1931 with 12 races, each in a different province. Future Formula One star Juan Manuel Fangio (Chevrolet) won the 1940 and 1941 editions of the TC. It was during this time that the series' Chevrolet-Ford rivalry began, with Ford acquiring most of its historical victories.

Categories

Open-wheel racing

In single-seater (open-wheel) racing, the wheels are not covered, and the cars often have aerofoil wings front and rear to produce downforce and enhance adhesion to the track. The two most popular varieties of open-wheel road racing are Formula One and the IndyCar Series. In Europe and Asia, open-wheeled racing is commonly referred to as 'Formula', with appropriate hierarchical suffixes. In North America, the 'Formula' terminology is not followed (with the exception of F1). The sport is usually arranged to follow an international format (such as F1), a regional format (such as the Formula 3 Euro Series), and/or a domestic, or country-specific, format (such as the German Formula 3 championship, or the British Formula Ford).

F1 is a worldwide series that runs only street circuit and race tracks. These cars are heavily based on technology and their aerodynamics. The speed record was set in 2005 by Juan Pablo Montoya hitting 373 km/h (232 mph). Some of the most prominent races are the Monaco Grand Prix, the Italian Grand Prix, and the British Grand Prix. The season ends with the crowning of the World Championship for drivers and constructors.

In the United States, the most popular series is the IndyCar Series. The cars have traditionally been similar to, though less technologically sophisticated than, F1 cars, with more restrictions on technology aimed at controlling costs. While these cars are not as technologically advanced, they are faster, mainly because they compete on oval race tracks, being able to average a lap at 388 km/h (241 mph). The series' biggest race is the Indianapolis 500, which is commonly referred to as "The Greatest Spectacle in Racing" due to being the longest continuously run race and having the largest crowd for a single-day sporting event (350,000+).

The other major international single-seater racing series is Formula 2 (formerly known as Formula 3000 and GP2 Series). Regional series include Super Formula and Formula V6 Asia (specifically in Asia), Formula Renault 3.5 (also known as the World Series by Renault, succession series of World Series by Nissan), Formula Three, Formula Palmer Audi and Formula Atlantic. In 2009, the FIA Formula Two Championship brought about the revival of the F2 series. Domestic, or country-specific, series include Formula Three and Formula Renault, with the leading introductory series being Formula Ford.

Single-seater racing is not limited merely to professional teams and drivers. There exist many amateur racing clubs. In the UK, the major club series are the Monoposto Racing Club, BRSCC F3 (Formerly ClubF3, formerly ARP F3), Formula Vee and Club Formula Ford. Each series caters to a section of the market, with some primarily providing low-cost racing, while others aim for an authentic experience using the same regulations as the professional series (BRSCC F3).

There are other categories of single-seater racing, including kart racing, which employs a small, low-cost machine on small tracks. Many of the current top drivers began their careers in karts. Formula Ford represents the most popular first open-wheel category for up-and-coming drivers stepping up from karts. The series is still the preferred option, as it has introduced an aero package and slicks, allowing the junior drivers to gain experience in a race car with dynamics closer to F1. The Star Mazda Series is another entry-level series.

Students at colleges and universities can also take part in single-seater racing through the Formula SAE competition, which involves designing and building a single-seater car in a multidisciplinary team and racing it at the competition. This also develops other soft skills, such as teamwork, while promoting motorsport and engineering.

The world's first all-female Formula racing team was created in 2006. The group was an assemblage of drivers from different racing disciplines and formed for an MTV reality pilot, which was shot at Mazda Raceway Laguna Seca.

In December 2005, the FIA gave approval to Superleague Formula racing, which debuted in 2008, whereby the racing teams are owned and run by prominent sports clubs such as A.C. Milan and Liverpool F.C.

After 25 years away from the sport, former Formula 2 champion Jonathan Palmer reopened the F2 category again; most drivers have graduated from the Formula Palmer Audi series. The category is officially registered as the FIA Formula Two championship. Most rounds have two races and are support races to the FIA World Touring Car Championship.

Touring car racing

Touring car racing is a style of road racing that is run with production-derived four-seat race cars. The lesser use of aerodynamics means following cars have a much easier time passing than in open-wheel racing. It often features full-contact racing with subtle bumping and nudging due to the small speed differentials and large grids.

The major touring car championships conducted worldwide are the Supercars Championship (Australia), British Touring Car Championship, Deutsche Tourenwagen Masters (DTM), World Touring Car Championship and the World Touring Car Cup. The European Touring Car Cup is a one-day event open to Super 2000 specification touring cars from Europe's many national championships.

The Sports Car Club of America's SPEED World Challenge Touring Car and GT championships are dominant in North America. America's historic Trans-Am Series is undergoing a period of transition, but is still the longest-running road racing series in the U.S. The National Auto Sport Association also provides a venue for amateurs to compete in home-built factory-derived vehicles on various local circuits.

Sports car racing

In sports car racing, production-derived versions of two-seat sports cars, also known as grand tourers (GTs), and purpose-built sports prototype cars compete within their respective classes on closed circuits. The premier championship series of sports car racing is the FIA World Endurance Championship. The main series for GT car racing is the Blancpain GT Series, divided into two separate championships: the Blancpain GT World Challenge Europe and the Blancpain GT Series Endurance Cup. This series has formed after the folding of the various FIA GT championships.

Other major GT championships include the Blancpain GT World Challenge America, Blancpain GT World Challenge Asia, Super GT, and the International GT Open. There are minor regional and national GT series using mainly GT4 and GT3 cars featuring both amateur and professional drivers.

Sports prototypes, unlike GT cars, do not rely on road-legal cars as a base. They are closed-wheel and often closed-cockpit purpose-built race cars intended mainly for endurance racing. They have much lower weight and more downforce compared to GT cars, making them much faster. They are raced in the 24 hours of Le Mans (held annually since 1923) and in the (European) Le Mans series, Asian Le Mans Series and the WeatherTech SportsCar Championship. These cars are referred to as LMP (Le Mans prototype) cars with LMP1 being run mainly by manufacturers and the slightly less powerful LMP2 cars run by privateer teams. All three Le Mans Series run GT cars in addition to Le Mans Prototypes; these cars have different restrictions than the FIA GT cars.

Another prototype and GT racing championship exists in the United States; the Grand-Am, which began in 2000, sanctions its own endurance series, the Rolex Sports Car Series, which consists of slower and lower-cost race cars compared to LMP and FIA GT cars. The Rolex Sports Car Series and American Le Mans Series announced a merger between the two series forming the WeatherTech SportsCar Championship starting in 2014.

These races are often conducted over long distances, at least , and cars are driven by teams of two or more drivers, switching every few hours. Due to the performance difference between production-based sports cars and purpose-built sports prototypes, one race usually involves several racing classes, each fighting for its own championship.

Famous sports car races include the 24 Hours of Le Mans, the Rolex 24 at Daytona, 24 Hours of Spa-Franchorchamps, the 12 Hours of Sebring, the 6 Hours of Watkins Glen, and the  Petit Le Mans at Road Atlanta. There is also the 24 Hours of the Nürburgring on the infamous Nordschleife track and the Dubai 24 Hour, which is aimed at GT3 and below cars with a mixture of professional and pro-am drivers.

Production-car racing

Production-car racing, otherwise known as "showroom stock" in the US, is an economical and rules-restricted version of touring-car racing, mainly used to restrict costs. Numerous production racing categories are based on particular makes of cars.

Most series, with a few exceptions, follow the Group N regulation. There are several different series that are run all over the world, most notably, Japan's Super Taikyu and IMSA's Firehawk Series, which ran in the 1980s and 1990s all over the United States.

Stock car racing

In North America, stock car racing is the most popular form of auto racing. Primarily raced on oval tracks, stock cars vaguely resemble production cars, but are in fact purpose-built racing machines that are built to tight specifications and, together with touring cars, also called Silhouette racing cars.

The largest stock car racing governing body is NASCAR (National Association for Stock Car Auto Racing). NASCAR's premier series is the NASCAR Cup Series, its most famous races being the Daytona 500, the Southern 500, the Coca-Cola 600, and the Brickyard 400. NASCAR also runs several feeder series, including the Xfinity Series and Gander RV & Outdoors Truck Series (a pickup truck racing series). The series conduct races across the entire continental United States. The NASCAR Pinty's Series conducts races across Canada and the NASCAR PEAK Mexico Series conducts races across Mexico.

NASCAR also governs several smaller regional series, such as the Whelen Modified Tour. Modified cars are best described as open-wheel cars. Modified cars have no parts related to the stock vehicle for which they are named after. A number of modified cars display a "manufacturer's" logo and "vehicle name", yet use components produced by another automobile manufacturer.

There are also other stock car governing bodies, most notably the Automobile Racing Club of America (ARCA).

In the UK, British Stock car racing is also referred to as "Short Circuit Racing". UK Stock car racing started in the 1950s and grew rapidly through the 1960s and 1970s. Events take place on shale or tarmac tracks – usually around 1/4 mile long. There are around 35 tracks in the UK and upwards of 7000 active drivers. The sport is split into three basic divisions – distinguished by the rules regarding car contact during racing. The most famous championship are the BriSCA F1 Stock Cars. 

Full-contact formulas include Bangers, Bombers, and Rookie Bangers – and racing features Demolition Derbies, Figure of Eight, and Oval Racing.

Semi Contact Formulas include BriSCA F1, F2, and Superstox – where bumpers are used tactically.

Non-contact formulas include National Hot Rods, Stock Rods, and Lightning Rods.

One-make racing

One-make, or single marque, championships often employ production-based cars from a single manufacturer or even a single model from a manufacturer's range. There are numerous notable one-make formulae from various countries and regions, some of which – such as the Porsche Supercup and, previously, IROC – have fostered many distinct national championships. Single marque series are often found at the club level, to which the production-based cars, limited modifications, and close parity in performance are very well suited. Some of the better-known single-make series are the Mini 7 Championship (Europe's longest-running one-make championship), the Radical European Masters, John Cooper Mini Challenge, Clio Cup, Ginettas, Caterhams, BMWs, and MX5s. There are also single-chassis single seater formulae, such as Formula Renault and Formula BMW, usually as "feeder" series for "senior" race formula (in the fashion of farm teams).

Rallying

Rallying is typically distinguished from other forms of motorsport by not running directly against other competitors over laps of a circuit, but instead in a point-to-point format in which participants leave at regular intervals from one or more start points. Cars compete on closed public roads or off-road areas on a point-to-point format where participants and their co-drivers "rally" to a set of points, leaving in regular intervals from start points. A rally is typically conducted over a number of "special stages" on any terrain, which entrants are often allowed to scout beforehand at reduced speeds compiling detailed shorthand descriptions of the track or road as they go. These detailed descriptions are known as pace notes. During the actual rally, the co-driver reads the pace notes aloud (using an in-helmet intercom system) to the driver, enabling them to complete each stage as quickly as possible. Competition is based on the lowest total elapsed time over the course of an event's special stages, including penalties.

Rallying at international and most national championship levels involves two classes of homologated road-legal production-based cars; Group N production cars and more modified Group A cars. The top series is the World Rally Championship (WRC), first contested in 1973, but there are also regional championships, and many countries have their own national championships. Some famous rallies include the Monte Carlo Rally, Rally Argentina, Rally Finland, and Rally GB. Another famous event (actually best described as a rally raid) is the Paris-Dakar Rally, conceived in 1978. There are also many smaller, club level, categories of rallies, which are popular with amateurs, making up the "grass roots" of motor sports. Cars at this level may not comply fully with the requirements of group A or group N homologation.

Other major rally events include the British Rally Championship, Intercontinental Rally Challenge, African Rally Championship, Asia-Pacific Rally Championship, and endurance rally events like the Dakar Rally.

The Targa Tasmania, held on the Australian island state of Tasmania and run annually since 1992, takes its name from the Targa Florio, a former motoring event held on the island of Sicily. The competition concept is drawn directly from the best features of the Mille Miglia, the Coupe des Alpes, and the Tour de Corse. Similarly named events around the world include the Targa Newfoundland based in Canada, Targa West based in Western Australia, Targa New Zealand, and other smaller events.

Time Attack Series

Time attack events began in Japan in the mid-1960s. They have since spread around the world.
Time Attack racing is a type of motorsport in which the racers compete for the best lap time. Each vehicle is timed through numerous circuits of the track. The racers make a preliminary circuit, then run the timed laps, and then finish with a cool-down lap.
Time Attack and time trial events differ by competition format and rules. Time Attack has a limited number of laps, time trial has open sessions.
Unlike other timed motorsport disciplines such as sprinting and hillclimbing, the car is required to start off under full rolling start conditions following a warm-up lap in which they will have to accelerate out as fast as possible to determine how fast they enter their timed lap. Commonly, as the cars are modified road-going cars, they are required to have tires authorized for road use.

Drag racing

In drag racing, the objective is to complete a given straight-line distance, from a standing start, ahead of a vehicle in a parallel lane. This distance is traditionally , though  has become popular since the 1990s. The vehicles may or may not be given the signal to start at the same time, depending on the class of racing. Vehicles range from the everyday car to the purpose-built dragster. Speeds and elapsed time differ from class to class. Drag racing was organized as a sport by Wally Parks in the early 1950s through the National Hot Rod Association (NHRA). The NHRA was formed to discourage street racing.

When launching, a top fuel dragster will accelerate at 3.4 g (33 m/s2), and when braking parachutes are deployed the deceleration is 4 g (39 m/s2), more than the Space Shuttle experiences.

Drag racing is two cars head-to-head, the winner proceeding to the next round. Professional classes are all first to the finish line wins. Sportsman racing is handicapped (slower car getting a head start) using an index (a lowest e.t. allowed), and cars running under (quicker than) their index "break out" and lose. The slowest cars, bracket racers, are also handicapped, but rather than an index, they use a dial-in.

Off-road racing

In off-road racing, various classes of specially modified vehicles, including cars, compete in races through off-road environments. In North America these races often take place in the desert, such as the famous Baja 1000. Another format for off-road racing happens on closed-course short course tracks such as Crandon International Off-Road Raceway. In the 1980s and 1990s, the short course was extended to racing inside stadiums in the Mickey Thompson Entertainment Group; this format was revived by Robby Gordon in 2013 with his Stadium Super Trucks series.

In Europe, "offroad" refers to events such as autocross or rallycross, while desert races and rally-raids such as the Paris-Dakar, Master Rallye or European "bajas" are called "cross-country rallies."

Kart racing

The modern kart was invented by Art Ingels, a fabricator at the Indianapolis-car manufacturer Kurtis-Kraft, in Southern California in 1956. Ingels took a small chainsaw engine and mounted it to a simple tube-frame chassis weighing less than 100 lb. Ingels, and everyone else who drove the kart, were startled at its performance capabilities. The sport soon blossomed in Southern California, and quickly spread around the world. Although often seen as the entry point for serious racers into the sport, kart racing, or karting, can be an economical way for amateurs to try racing and is also a fully-fledged international sport in its own right. A large proportion of professional racing drivers began in karts, often from a very young age, such as Michael Schumacher and Fernando Alonso. Several former motorcycle champions have also taken up the sport, notably Wayne Rainey, who was paralysed in a racing accident and now races a hand-controlled kart. As one of the cheapest ways to race, karting is seeing its popularity grow worldwide.

Despite their diminutive size, karts of the most powerful class, superkart (assuming a weight of 205 kg (452 lb), and a power output of 100 hp (75 kW)), can have a power-to-weight ratio (including the driver) of 490 hp/tonne (0.22 hp/lb). Without the driver, this figure doubles, to almost 980 hp/tonne (0.44 hp/lb).

Historical racing

Historic motorsport or vintage motorsport uses vehicles limited to a particular era. Only safety precautions are modernized in these hobbyist races. A historical event can be of various types of motorsport disciplines, from road racing to rallying. Because it is based on a particular era it is more hobbyist-oriented, reducing corporate sponsorship. The only modern equipment used is related to safety and timing. A historical event can be of a number of different motorsport disciplines.

Some of the most famous events include the Goodwood Festival of Speed and Goodwood Revival in Britain and Monterey Historic in the United States. Championships range from "grass root" Austin Seven racing to the FIA Thoroughbred Grand Prix Championship for classic Formula One chassis. While there are several professional teams and drivers in historical racing, this branch of auto sport tends to be contested by wealthy car owners and is thus more amateur and less competitive in its approach.

Other categories

Use of flags

In many types of auto races, particularly those held on closed courses, flags are displayed to indicate the general status of the track and to communicate instructions to competitors. While individual series have different rules, and the flags have changed from the first years (e.g., red used to start a race), these are generally accepted.

Accidents

The worst accident in racing history is the 1955 Le Mans disaster, where more than 80 people died, including the French driver Pierre Levegh.

Racing-car setup

In auto racing, the racing setup or car setup is the set of adjustments made to the vehicle to optimize its behaviour (performance, handling, reliability, etc.). Adjustments can occur in suspensions, brakes, transmissions, engines, tires, and many others.

Aerodynamics
Aerodynamics and airflow play big roles in the setup of a race car. Aerodynamic downforce improves the race car's handling by lowering the center of gravity and distributing the weight of the car equally on each tire. Once this is achieved, fuel consumption decreases and the forces against the car are significantly lowered. Many aerodynamic experiments are conducted in wind tunnels, to simulate real-life situations while measuring the various drag forces on the car. These "Rolling roads" produce many wind situations and direct air flow at certain speeds and angles. When a diffuser is installed under the car, the amount of drag force is significantly lowered, and the overall aerodynamics of the vehicle is positively adjusted. Wings and canards channel the airflow in the most efficient way to get the least amount of drag from the car. It is experimentally proven that downforce is gained and the vehicle's handling is considerably changed when aerodynamic wings on the front and rear of the vehicle are installed.

Suspension
Suspension plays a huge part in giving the race car the ability to be driven optimally. Shocks are mounted vertically or horizontally to prevent the body from rolling in the corners. The suspension is important because it makes the car stable and easier to control and keeps the tires on the road when driving on uneven terrain. It works in three different ways including vertically, longitudinally, and laterally to control movement when racing on various tracks.

Tyres
Tyres called R-Compounds are commonly used in motorsports for high amounts of traction. The soft rubber allows them to expand when they are heated up, making more surface area on the pavement, therefore producing the most traction. These types of tyres do not have grooves on them. Tyre pressure is dependent on the temperature of the tyre and track when racing. Each time a driver pulls into the pits, the tyre pressure and temperature should be tested for optimal performance. When the tyres get too hot they will swell or inflate and need to be deflated to the correct pressure. When the tyres are not warmed up they will not perform as well.

Brakes
Brakes on a race car are imperative in slowing and stopping the car at precise times and wear quickly depending on the road or track on which the car is being raced, how many laps are being run, track conditions due to weather, and how many caution runs require more braking. There are three variables to consider in racing: brake pedal displacement, brake pedal force, and vehicle deceleration. Various combinations of these variables work together to determine the stiffness, sensitivity, and pedal force of the brakes. When using the brakes effectively, the driver must go through a buildup phase and end with a modulating phase. These phases include attaining maximum deceleration and modulating the brake pressure. Brake performance is measured in bite and consistency. Bite happens when the driver first applies the brakes and they have not warmed up to the correct temperature to operate efficiently. Consistency is measured in how consistent the friction is during the entire time of braking. These two measurements determine the wear of the brakes.

Engine
The race car's engine needs a considerable amount of air to produce maximum power. The air intake manifold sucks the air from scoops on the hood and front bumper and feeds it into the engine. Many engine modifications to increase horsepower and efficiency are commonly used in many racing-sanctioning bodies. Engines are tuned on a machine called a dynamometer, which is commonly known in the racing world as a DYNO. The car is driven onto the DYNO and many gauges and sensors are hooked up to the car that are controlled by an online program to test force, torque, or power. Through the testing, the car's engine maps can be changed to get the most horsepower and ultimately speed out of the vehicle.

Racing driver

Racing drivers, at the highest levels, are usually paid by the team, or by sponsors, and can command very substantial salaries.

Contrary to what may be popularly assumed, racing drivers as a group do not have unusually better reflexes or peripheral response time. During repeated physiological (and psychological) evaluations of professional racing drivers, the two characteristics that stand out are racers' near-obsessive need to control their surroundings (the psychological aspect), and an unusual ability to process fast-moving information (physiological). In this, researchers have noted a strong correlation between racers' psychological profiles and those of fighter pilots. In tests comparing racers to members of the general public, the greater the complexity of the information processing matrix, the greater the speed gap between racers and the public.

Due partly to the performance capabilities of modern racing cars, racing drivers require a high level of fitness, focus, and the ability to concentrate at high levels for long periods in an inherently difficult environment. Racing drivers mainly complain about pains in the lumbar, shoulder, and neck regions.

Racing drivers experience extremely large g-forces because formula cars and sports prototypes generate more downforce and are able to corner at significantly higher speeds. Formula 1 drivers routinely experience g-loadings in excess of 4.5 g.

See also

 Outline of auto racing
 List of auto racing tracks
 Motorcycle racing
 Race track
 List of auto racing films
 Racing video game

References

External links
 

 Sanctioning bodies
 Motorsports UK Association 
 American Le Mans Series (ALMS)
 Indy Racing League (IRL)
 World Rally Championship (WRC)
 Fédération Internationale de l'Automobile (FIA)
 Grand American Road Racing Association
 International Conference of Sports Car Clubs (ICSCC)
 International Hot Rod Association (IHRA)
 International Motor Sports Association (IMSA)
 National Auto Sport Association
 National Association for Stock Car Auto Racing (NASCAR)
 National Hot Rod Association (NHRA)
 No Prep Racing
 SCORE International Off-Road Racing
 Sports Car Club of America (SCCA)
 United States Auto Club (USAC)
 Formula One (F1)
 Confederation of Australian Motorsport (CAMS)
 Best In The Desert Off-Road Racing